His Lordship Alfredo Augusto das Neves Holtreman, 1st Viscount of Alvalade, was a Portuguese lawyer and businessman. He was the first president of Sporting CP, from 1906 to 1910, club founded by his grandson José Alvalade.

History

Alfredo Holtreman graduated in Coimbra Bachelor of Law and settled in Lisbon, one of the family farms in Lumiar, becoming one of the most prestigious lawyers in the Capital.

In 1859, he married D. Julieta Natalina Luiza Guerin, of whom he had two daughters, one of them mother of Jose Alfredo Holtreman Roquette (José Alvalade), future promoter of the birth of Sporting CP.

On 22 July 1898 he was graced by King D. Carlos with the title of 1st Viscount of Alvalade

He was a very cheerful man who encouraged his grandchildren, whom he liked to see gathered in his mansion, in intense activity with other young people.

That was how Jose remembered his grandfather when he decided to found a great club and asked for money. This one did not hesitate and it advanced to him 200,000 reis, making available still land of his farm for the construction of the sporting and social facilities of the Club, that became known like Sítio das Mouras.

He was immediately declared a protective partner and was elected the first president of Sporting, functions that would stop on 4 January 1910, happening then to preside to the General Assembly until 28 July 1917.

In 1907 he wrote the first statutes of Sporting CP, being declared Titular Partner of the Club in 1910 and Member of Honor in 1912.

By the time he died in 1920 he had already left the Club, discouraged by the premature death of his grandson.

On 30 June 2017 he was awarded the Lions Honoris Sporting award in the Honor Class category.

References

Sporting CP
Sporting CP presidents
1837 births
1920 deaths